Voltigeurs DGC is an 18-hole disc golf course located in Drummondville, Quebec, Canada. The course was established in 2015 in collaboration with Club Disc Golf Drummondville, Albatroz Disc Golf, Peter Lizotte and the city of Drummondville. It is the home course of the Association Disc Golf Centre-du-Québec (ADGCQ). Voltigeurs DGC ranks among the highest-rated disc golf courses in Quebec.

Tournaments 
La Bataille des Voltigeurs, part of the PDGA-sanctioned Tournée Pro-Am Disc Golf series, was held at the Voltigeurs disc golf course in early June 2018 and 2019

See also 
 List of disc golf courses in Quebec

References

External links 

 
 Official map
 Voltigeurs Disc Golf Course on DG Course Review
 Voltigeurs DGC on the PDGA course directory
 Course walkthrough video

Disc golf courses in Quebec